The Haugesund Seagulls are an ice hockey team in Haugesund, Norway. They currently play in the First Division, the second level of Norwegian ice hockey. The teams plays its home games in the Haugesund Ishall.

History
The club was founded on January 9, 2009.

External links
Official website

Ice hockey teams in Norway
Ice hockey clubs established in 2009
2009 establishments in Norway
Sport in Haugesund